Sarv Dar (also Romanized as Sarv Dār and Sarūdār; also known as Sarvdār-e Pā’īn and Sardār-e Pā’īn) is a village in Adaran Rural District, Asara District, Karaj County, Alborz Province, Iran. At the 2006 census, its population was 347, in 110 families.

References 

Populated places in Karaj County